Lee Valley or Lea Valley can refer to:

Greer, Arizona, an unincorporated community founded as Lee Valley
Lea Valley, the valley of the River Lea (or River Lee) in England
Lee Valley Park
Lee Valley Athletics Centre
Lee Valley Hockey and Tennis Centre
Lee Valley Ice Centre
Lee Valley Leisure Complex
Lee Valley VeloPark
Lee Valley White Water Centre
Lee Valley Regional Park Authority
Lea Valley, Hertfordshire, a location in Wheathampstead parish
Lee Valley, Ontario, an unincorporated community in Canada
Lea Valley Academy, Enfield, England
Lea Valley lines, railways in England
Lee Valley Tools, Canadian purveyor of woodworking and gardening tools